George Bourchier may refer to:

George Bourchier (Elizabethan soldier) (c. 1535–1605), English soldier who fought and settled in Ireland
George Bouchier or Bourchier (died 1643), wealthy merchant of Bristol who supported the royalist cause during the English Civil War
George Bourchier (Indian Army officer) (1821–1898), served in the Bengal Army (one of three armies that made up the British Indian Army)